Windward Mall is an enclosed shopping center located in Kāneohe, Hawaii, anchored by Macy's, and Regal Cinemas. The  mall, owned by Kamehameha Schools, was managed by General Growth Properties until 2011 when General Growth Properties and Jones Lang LaSalle entered an agreement to transfer managership to Jones Lang LaSalle.

The mall underwent a significant $23 million renovation in 2006 to improve the interior and add new retail tenants.
 
On April 15, 2019, it was announced that Sears would be closing on April 30, 2019. The former Sears space will soon be replaced with a new Target store, which is slated to open in 2022.

On January 4, 2023, it was announced that Macy's would shutter.

See also
Ala Moana Center
Kahala Mall

References

External links
Windward Mall official site

Buildings and structures in Honolulu
JLL (company)
Shopping malls in Hawaii
Shopping malls established in 1982
Tourist attractions in Honolulu
1982 establishments in Hawaii
Commercial properties of Kamehameha Schools